Zhejiang Chunfeng Power Co., Ltd., commonly known by its trade name CFMoto, is a Chinese manufacturer of engines, motorcycles, all-terrain vehicles,  quadricycles, quads, and yachts headquartered in Hangzhou, Zhejiang, China. It is well-known for their high-end motorcycle and ATVs. The Chunfeng CF650-2 and CF1250J models produced by the company are police vehicles used by public security agencies in many provinces and cities.

History
CFMoto was established in 1989 by Lai Guoqiang. In 2013, it began to be involved in the constructing high-end yachts.

In 2011, CFMoto and KTM entered into a commercial partnership. In 2017, the two companies started a joint venture that allows the production and sale of KTM motorcycles in China under the name of "KTMR2R". CFMoto also assembles the small displacement models on behalf of KTM in its Chinese factories and also produces the large displacement KTM engines.

Since 2017, CFMoto has been listed on the Shanghai Stock Exchange as Chunfeng Power with the code 603129.

Sales and marketing
CFMoto designs and manufactures 400-1000cc ATVs, 500-1000cc SSVs, 1000cc UTVs, and 125-800cc motorcycles. Its annual production capacity is 800,000 engines and more than 600,000 vehicles distributed in more than 100 countries and distributed by more than 2,000 partners.

Racing
In 2022, CFMoto made its debut in the Moto3 class of the Grand Prix motorcycle racing. In fact, two KTM RC250GPs rebranded CFMoto were lined up by the Prüstel GP team. The riders chosen for the debut season were Spaniards Xavier Artigas and Carlos Tatay. At the Indonesian Grand Prix, Tatay started on pole position and finished in third place, a first for CFMoto.

Models
Motorcycles
 250SR (300SR in some countries and regions)
 150NK
 250NK
 300NK
 400NK
 650NK
 400GT
 650GT
 650MT
 650TR-G	
 700CL-X
 700CL-X Sport
 800MT Sport
 800MT Touring

Quads
CForce 450
CForce 520
CForce 600
CForce 625
CForce 850
CForce 1000
CForce 1000 Overland

SSV
UForce 600
UForce 800
UForce 1000
ZForce 550
ZForce 800
ZForce 1000
ZForce 1000 Sport

Racing

Grand Prix

Moto3
After being acquired by KTM, Gas Gas entered the Moto3 World Championship as a unique constructor using their KTM-based motorcycle.

Notes

References

External links

Motorcycle manufacturers of China
Vehicle manufacturing companies established in 1989
Chinese brands
Chinese companies established in 1989
Companies listed on the Shanghai Stock Exchange
Yacht building companies